Westfarms is a shopping mall on the West Hartford–Farmington town line in the U.S. state of Connecticut. It was opened in 1974, expanded in 1982 and 1995–1997, and remodeled in 2008–2009. With  of gross leasable area, Westfarms is the third-largest mall in Connecticut. It is located on Route 71, off the I-84 and Route 9 junction and near several open-air shopping plazas. The mall is currently owned and managed by Taubman Centers, a subsidiary of Simon Property Group.

History
Westfarms opened in 1974. It was developed by Bloomfield Hills-based Taubman Centers, which remains in charge of its management since then. Its original anchors were G. Fox & Co., J. C. Penney, and Sage-Allen. The mall was expanded with a new retail wing in 1982, which included a Lord & Taylor store. They relocated from Bishops Corner in West Hartford.

Hartford-based G. Fox was acquired by Boston-based Filene's in 1992, and the Westfarms store was rebranded on January 30, 1993. Sage-Allen filed for Chapter 11 bankruptcy in 1992, and closed permanently in 1993. Facing competition from the newer Buckland Hills Mall in nearby Manchester, Taubman began a USD $100-million renovation and expansion of Westfarms in 1995. In the first phase, Filene's and Lord & Taylor were remodeled, and the vacated Sage-Allen space became a Filene's Men's & Home. A four-level parking garage was built in the second phase in 1996, and a new retail wing between J. C. Penney and Lord & Taylor with two additional parking garages was completed in 1997. The wing is anchored by Seattle-based Nordstrom, which opened on September 6, 1997. It was the first Nordstrom in New England and remained their only store in Connecticut until The SoNo Collection in Norwalk opened in 2019.

On September 9, 2006, Filene's became Macy's.

In August 2020, Lord & Taylor announced they would be shuttering their brick-and-mortar retail base after modernizing into a digital collective department store. In December, 2022, it was announced that Jordan's Furniture would be reconstructing the original Lord & Taylor structure which will open by 2024.

Architecture 
Unlike many enclosed malls, Westfarms does not feature a common-area food court, but some wings of the mall contain several quick service restaurants that are housed in their own storefronts.

List of anchor stores

Gallery

References

External links

Shopping malls in Connecticut
Buildings and structures in West Hartford, Connecticut
Shopping malls established in 1974
Taubman Centers
Tourist attractions in Hartford County, Connecticut
1974 establishments in Connecticut